Formin-binding protein 4 is a protein that in humans is encoded by the FNBP4 gene.

Mutations in this gene have been found associated to cases similar to microphthalmia with limb anomalies (doi: 10.1002/ajmg.a.35983).

References

Further reading